Tarlan may refer to:

Geography
Tarlan, Arak county, in Iran
Tarlan, Komijan county, in Iran

Patronyms
Tarlan Ahmadov (b. 1971), Azerbaijani footballer
Tarlan Karimov (b. 1986), Azerbaijani judoka

See also
Tərlan (disambiguation)